Skyline Apartments is a skyscraper in Brisbane, Queensland, Australia located in the CBD residential precinct known as Petrie Bight. Upon completion it was the third tallest residential building in Brisbane.

The  2,631 m2 site was formerly home to the 4BC Radio Studios, and is located on the Brisbane River in close proximity to the Story Bridge. The upper levels of the tower boast spectaculars views down both reaches of the Brisbane River.

The building contains 192 residential apartments, including two 2-level penthouse apartments. It is designed by Brisbane-based nettletontribe architects.  Uniquely for a CBD building, the complex also includes tennis court as well as a gym, steam room and heated pool.

See also

List of tallest buildings in Australia
List of tallest buildings in Brisbane

References

External links
 

Skyscrapers in Brisbane
Residential buildings completed in 2007
Residential skyscrapers in Australia
Apartment buildings in Brisbane
Brisbane central business district
2007 establishments in Australia